St. Luke's Medical Center (SLMC) is a private non-profit health care institution based in Quezon City, Metro Manila, Philippines which operates two hospitals of the same name in Quezon City and Taguig.

Founded by the American missionary Charles Henry Brent under the Protestant Episcopal Church in the United States (Protestant Episcopal Church in the United States of America) in 1903, it is the third American and Protestant founded hospital in the Philippines after CPU–Iloilo Mission Hospital and Silliman University Medical Center.

The St. Luke's Medical Center in Quezon City serves as the university hospital of the Trinity University of Asia, the first Protestant Episcopalian university in Asia.

History

St. Luke’s was established in 1903 by American Episcopalian missionaries as a charity ward and dispensary hospital. St. Luke's started out as fully free outpatient clinic for the poor in Calle Magdalena, Tondo. It also supports and conducts medical, dental and surgical missions in rural areas. It was transformed into an independent, non-sectarian, non-stock, non-profit corporation in the 1970s.

Facilities

Hospitals

St. Luke's Medical Center Inc. maintains two hospitals, one in Quezon City and another at the Bonifacio Global City in Taguig. SLMC is based in the Quezon City Hospital while the Taguig hospital is a wholly owned corporation of the Quezon City-based SLMC.

Extension clinic
There is also an extension clinic located in Ermita, Manila. The extension clinic caters primarily to those patients seeking medical examination requirements for Visa application for US, Australia, Canada, and New Zealand.

College

International affiliates
On 1 February 2005, St. Luke's signed an Affiliation Agreement with Memorial-Sloan Kettering Cancer Center in New York City. SLMC also have affiliations with New York- Presbyterian Hospital, Columbia University College of Physicians and Surgeons and Weill Cornell Medical College of Cornell University.

References

External links
Official Website of St. Luke's Medical Center (Quezon City)
Official Website of St. Luke's Medical Center (Global City)

Hospitals in Metro Manila
Hospitals established in 1903
1903 establishments in the Philippines
Protestant hospitals in the Philippines
Hospital networks in the Philippines